DISTED College is a private college within George Town, the capital city of the Malaysian state of Penang. It was established in 1987 as the first Penang-based private tertiary institution. The college provides various pre-university, diploma and degree courses, some of which are twinned with foreign universities.

The DISTED  Heritage campus is on Macalister Road in close vicinity to downtown George Town, a UNESCO World Heritage Site. The college is wholly owned by Wawasan Open University.

History 
DISTED College was the brainchild of three educationists - Gajaraj Dhanarajan, Hulman Sinaga and Sharom Ahmat - who in 1985 formed DISTED Services Sdn Bhd, a private limited company. The name DISTED is the acronym for Distance Education, which suited the original intention of the trio - to provide adults an alternate route to tertiary education; it was felt that, compared to high school leavers, adults had more limited prospects of obtaining higher education.

However, due to the high costs of tertiary courses abroad, the trio soon had to alter their direction to cater to the youth. By 1987, contracts were signed with the British Columbia Open University, TAFE South Australia, Murdoch University and the Warrnambool Institute of Advanced Education to provide off-campus courses to Penangites. Within the same year, DISTED College was registered with Malaysia's Ministry of Higher Education.

DISTED took in its first cohort of students in 1988. At the time, it was housed inside a bungalow at Hargreaves Road in George Town. The lack of space forced the college to relocate to RECSAM within the suburb of Gelugor, and then to the St. Joseph's Novitiate at Kelawei Road (now part of Gurney Paragon).

In 1995, DISTED College finally moved into its current premises at Macalister Road, occupying a mansion formerly owned by a prominent 19th century tycoon, Yeap Chor Ee. The campus was expanded in 1997. In year 2012 DISTED College's shares were entirely acquired by Wawasan Open University.

Academic programmes

Pre-university 
 GCE A-Level (provided by Cambridge Assessment International Education)
 South Australian Certificate of Education
Foundation in Arts

Diploma 
 Diploma in Accounting
 Diploma in Business Information Technology
 Diploma in Business Studies
 Diploma in Computer Science
 Diploma in Creative Multimedia Production
 Diploma in Electrical and Electronic Engineering
 Diploma in Food and Beverage Management
 Diploma in Hotel Management

Transfer programmes 
Students who have graduated with a diploma from DISTED College will have the option of undergoing any one of the transfer programmes with foreign universities.
 Japan
 Diploma in Computer Science
 Diploma in Electrical and Electronic Engineering
 Taiwan 
 I-Shou University
 Diploma in Business Studies
 Diploma in Creative Multimedia Production
 Diploma in Hotel Management
 United Kingdom
 University of Gloucestershire
 Diploma in Business Studies + Business and Technology Education Council Higher National Diploma
 Diploma in Computer Science + Business and Technology Education Council Higher National Diploma
 Diploma in Business Information Technology + Business and Technology Education Council Higher National Diploma
 Diploma in Creative Multimedia Production + Business and Technology Education Council Higher National Diploma
 Birmingham City University
 Diploma in Business Studies + Business and Technology Education Council Higher National Diploma
 Diploma in Accounting + Business and Technology Education Council Higher National Diploma
 Middlesex University
 Diploma in Hospitality Business Management + Business and Technology Education Council Higher National Diploma
 Diploma in Computer Science + Business and Technology Education Council Higher National Diploma
 Diploma in Business Information Technology + Business and Technology Education Council Higher National Diploma
 Solent University
 Diploma in Creative Multimedia Production + Business and Technology Education Council Higher National Diploma

Degrees 
HELP University
Psychology
Staffordshire University
Accounting & Finance
International Business Management
Marketing Management

Other certificates 
Other courses offered by DISTED include:

Chartered Certified Accountant (ACCA) from the Association of Chartered Certified Accountants
Pearson Test of English Academic

Ratings 
DISTED College was awarded a five-star rating in the Malaysian Quality Evaluation System (MyQUEST) 2014/2015, which was conducted by Malaysia's Ministry of Higher Education.

References 

Colleges in Malaysia
Universities and colleges in Penang
Buildings and structures in George Town, Penang
Educational institutions established in 1987
1987 establishments in Malaysia